Rhythmic adult contemporary, often abbreviated as rhythmic AC or RAC, is an adult contemporary radio format. The format focuses primarily on rhythmic hits aimed towards an adult audience, often resembling a mixture of the classic hits and hot adult contemporary formats in practice. It typically focuses on genres such as disco, classic hip-hop, dance pop, and house music of the late 1980s/early 1990s.

Format history
The first station to try this approach was WHBT/Milwaukee, Wisconsin, which lasted from 1986 to 1987, although it was more Hot AC in nature. But eight years later in 1996, another Milwaukee outlet, WAMG, "Magic 103.7", would be the first to pioneer the "Official" rhythmic AC format, calling itself "Rhythm & Romance" which featured Mid-tempo Rhythmic R&B/Pop tracks (ironically, Milwaukee would once again pick up a Rhythmic AC for the third time in December 2014, when WZTI filled the void after an eighteen-year gap, although that station leaned towards rhythmic oldies; it returned to a True Oldies Channel-led oldies format in August 2015).

In February 1996, WYNY in New York City flipped to the format under the name "103-5 The New KTU", utilizing a "Rhythmic Hot AC" approach with Dance-Pop tracks added to the mix. The station instantly skyrocketed to #1 in the New York City Arbitron ratings in the next book. Because of this, other stations, like KBKS/Seattle, WDRQ/Detroit (which likewise referred to itself as "93-1 The New DRQ") and KIBB/Los Angeles flipped to the format.  While WDRQ was a moderate ratings success (the station's true ratings boom came after it evolved into a rhythmic-oriented Contemporary Hit format by 1999), KBKS and KIBB were less successful, resulting in KBKS flipping to Top 40/CHR in May 1997, and KIBB flipped to a format they pioneered: "rhythmic oldies", in November 1997.

Beginning in 2006, there was a trend of several stations in the United States switching to the rhythmic AC format using the brand Movin, which debuted on Seattle station KQMV in May of that year. Clear Channel Communications also enjoyed a fair amount of success with Rhythmic AC during this time period, using the continued success of WKTU as its basis for several of its stations, including WDTW-FM Detroit, WMIA Miami, and WISX Philadelphia. This boom screeched to a halt by the early 2010s, with many of the stations evolving into Mainstream or Rhythmic Top 40 (like KQMV or KMVQ San Francisco), or flipping to other formats, in part due to declining ratings and trying to adapt currents into this niche genre.  As of July 2016, only a handful of "Movin'" branded stations remain with a Rhythmic AC format (see list below).

Rhythmic AC came to Canada in 1999, when French-language CFGL-FM in Montreal, Quebec made its debut as "Rythme FM" name. However, the Rythme FM network is now adult contemporary.  During the mid-2000s, when the format started to gain popularity, many hot adult contemporary stations in Canada started to follow a Rhythmic AC approach, but still remain Hot AC because of pop-rock content still being played. This was first pioneered by CHUM-FM in Toronto, who had a significant ratings success after starting to lean rhythmic. This approach has worked well in Montreal, where CKBE has had more success with the Rhythmic Hot AC format since its shift from AC in 2011. Unlike CHUM-FM, the currents on CKBE's playlist are more Dance and Rhythmic leaning.

By 2013, the Rhythmic AC format began to make a comeback in certain markets.  In January of that year, former news/talk outlet WTKK in Boston flipped to the format. The station's ratings, which were low, have significantly improved to compete effectively with Rhythmic Top 40 WJMN. The station's playlist, initially, had a balance of dance-pop tracks and rhythmic classics, as well as current rhythmic/pop material, but by July 2013, the playlist has shifted to a more urban lean. This revival success story of the format spawned a few similar stations later that year, including KHTP in Seattle, KSSX in San Diego and KRBQ in San Francisco, as well as (for a short time) WIQI in Chicago. KHTP and KRBQ have since shifted in a more Classic Hip-Hop direction, positioning themselves as all-"Throwback" stations, while KSSX flipped to Mainstream Urban in May 2016. The Rhythmic AC renaissance has been particularly felt in the state of Florida: in March 2016, WMIA-FM in Miami, which had switched from Rhythmic AC to Hot AC in August 2014, returned to Rhythmic AC with the slogan "Rhythm from the '80s to Now," and four months later, WJSJ in Jacksonville adopted a "Classic Dance" approach. And in Canada, former Urban outlet CFXJ-FM Toronto went Rhythmic AC as "93.5 The Move" in February 2016.

In January 2015, KKGQ/Wichita was relaunched with the same Rhythmic AC presentation that was previously offered by its successor KMXW from 2004 to 2007, except this time around, it was more focused on current Rhythmic and Mainstream Pop hits and recurrents from the 1990s and 2000s (KMXW's presentation had an emphasis on 1970s and 1980s product). (That station would completely shift towards Hot AC by October 2015, with most of the Rhythmic material being moved to evening hours.) Also in 2015, KJHM in Denver shifted to the format after spending its first 5 years with rhythmic oldies, marking the second station with the format in the market, the first being KPTT from 2006 to 2009.

The new crop of Rhythmic AC stations varies by market as to how much hip-hop and R&B product are included in the music mix.  Whereas the aforementioned KHTP and KRBQ have repositioned themselves as all-"Throwback" stations specializing in Classic Hip-Hop, WKTU, WMOV in Norfolk and WFLC Miami lean toward pop and dance, with the latter two continuing to incorporate "throwbacks" from as far back as the disco era of the 1970s.

List of recording artists whose records are played on rhythmic AC radio stations 

Aaliyah
ABBA
Ace of Base
Akon
Alicia Keys
Amber
Arrested Development
Bee Gees
Beyoncé
Blondie
Brenda K. Starr
Britney Spears
Carrie Lucas
Cascada
Cathy Dennis
CeCe Peniston
Cheryl Lynn
Chic
Chris Brown
Christina Aguilera
Coro
Deniece Williams
Destiny's Child
Donna Summer
Dr. Dre
En Vogue
Exposé
Fergie
Freeez
Gloria Gaynor
INOJ
Jamie Foxx
Janet Jackson
Jay-Z
Jennifer Lopez
Joe
John Legend
Jomanda
Justin Timberlake
K-Ci & JoJo
KC and the Sunshine Band
Kanye West
Katy Perry
Kesha
Kylie Minogue
La Bouche
Lady Gaga
Leona Lewis
Lisa Lisa and Cult Jam
Lisette Melendez
Loleatta Holloway
Luther Vandross
Madonna
Mariah Carey
Mary J. Blige
Michael Jackson
Nayobe
Nolan Thomas
OutKast
Patti LaBelle
Paula Abdul
Pebbles
Prince
Real McCoy
Rihanna
Salt-n-Pepa
Sean Paul
Shannon
SOS Band
T-Pain
Taylor Dayne
The Jets
Timbaland
Timex Social Club
TLC
War
Whitney Houston
Will Smith

List of radio stations using this format

United States
WKTU - New York, New York ("Rhythmic Hot AC")
KPWR - Los Angeles, California ("Rhythmic Hot AC")
WSTR – Atlanta, Georgia
KXQQ-FM - Las Vegas, Nevada ("Rhythmic Hot AC")
KUMU-FM - Honolulu ("Rhythmic AC", but leans "Rhythmic Oldies")
KUBT-HD2 - Honolulu (leans towards classic hip hop)
KMVN - Anchorage, Alaska
KOCN - Pacific Grove, California
KFBT - Fresno, California
WBEN-HD2 - Philadelphia, Pennsylvania (HD2 subcarrier of WBEN-FM)
KZLJ-LP - La Junta, Colorado
KJHM-FM - Denver, Colorado ("Rhythmic oldies-Leaning Rhythmic AC")
KLBU - Santa Fe, New Mexico ("Rhythmic Hot AC")
WKZF - Peoria, Illinois ("Retro Hits"; leans towards Rhythmic pop recurrents)
KXJM - Portland, Oregon (CHR-Rhythmic) leans towards Rhythmic AC.
Dance Show With MJR KVFX Logan, Utah [Saturdays at 10PM MST], [102.7 in New Hampshire] [Mixcloud] [www.mixcloud.com/michaeljohn-roach]
WFLC - Miami, Florida ("Rhythmic Hot AC")
WQTX - Lansing, Michigan ("Rhythmic AC"; leans towards classic hip-hop)
KJXX - Cape Girardeau, Missouri ("Rhythmic Hot AC")
KMVA/KZON - Dewey-Humboldt, Arizona/Gilbert, Arizona ("Rhythmic Hot AC")
KUUU - Salt Lake City, Utah (leans towards classic hip hop)

Mexico
XHRM - Tijuana, Baja California (technically "Rhythmic Oldies", but leans Rhythmic AC)

Canada
CHMX-FM - Regina
CKBE-FM - Montreal
CKPW-FM - Edmonton

Internet stations
Hot 102 (Online station patterned after WLUM's "Hot 102" Rhythmic format from 1979 to 1994, mixed in with currents) - Milwaukee
BDJ Berlin Digital Jack - Berlin, New York
Chill-FM - San Francisco, CA

Former stations that used this format
KHHT - Los Angeles (technically "Rhythmic Oldies", but leaned Rhythmic AC)
KMVN - Los Angeles
KIBB - Los Angeles
KHTI - Lake Arrowhead, California ("Rhythmic Hot AC")
WMIA - Miami Beach, Florida ("Rhythmic Hot AC")
WNEW-FM - New York City
WMOV-FM - Norfolk, Virginia ("Rhythmic Hot AC")
WMUV - Brunswick, Georgia
WZDJ - Fernandina Beach, Florida (Originally a hybrid of Rhythmic AC and Dance Classics, only to evolve to Dance-leaning Rhythmic Top 40)
KISQ - San Francisco (switched to Soft AC in April 2016) 
KMVQ - San Francisco
KRBQ - San Francisco ("Rhythmic Hot AC") (has since shifted towards Classic hip-hop)
KSSX - Carlsbad, California ("Rhythmic Hot AC") (has since flipped to Urban Contemporary)
KMVK - Fort Worth, Texas
WWVA-FM - Canton, Georgia
WDTW-FM - Detroit, Michigan
WDRQ - Detroit, Michigan
WDZH-HD3 - Detroit, Michigan (leans towards classic Hip-Hop/R&B)
KMVA - Dewey-Humboldt, Arizona
KYOT-FM - Phoenix, Arizona
WPTY - Long Island, New York
KUDL - Sacramento, California
KHYL - Auburn, California
KQMV - Bellevue, Washington
KHTP - Tacoma, Washington 
KBKS-FM - Tacoma, Washington
KDEY-FM - Ontario, California
KPHT - Rocky Ford, Colorado
KPTT - Denver, Colorado
WBQT - Boston ("Rhythmic Hot AC")
WQSX - Boston
WEEI-HD2 - Boston (HD2 subcarrier of WEEI-FM; former format of predecessor WQSX)
WHBT (now WKKV) - Racine, Wisconsin
WAMG (now WXSS) - Wauwatosa, Wisconsin
WKPO - Evansville, Wisconsin
KVMX - Banks, Oregon
KPLV - Las Vegas 
KYMV - Woodruff, Utah
KYKA - Meadow Lakes, Alaska
WSNA - Germantown, Tennessee
KTFM - Floresville, Texas
KFMK - Round Rock, Texas
K276EL - Austin, Texas
WNCB - Cary, North Carolina (flipped to its current country format in November 2013)
WRGV - Pensacola, Florida
KDEO-FM - Waipahu, Hawaii
KHKA - Honolulu, Hawaii 
KHJZ/K256AS - Honolulu, Hawaii 
KQBT - Rio Rancho, New Mexico
KMXW - Newton, Kansas (2004-2007; returned to format in 2015 as KKGQ)
KKGQ - Newton, Kansas (since shifted to Hot AC)
KEXA - King City, California
WDVW - LaPlace, Louisiana
WSMK - Niles, Michigan (South Bend area)
KVBE - Hanford, California 
KOKO-FM - Kerman, California
WZJZ - Port Charlotte, Florida
KENR - Superior, Montana
KBZD - Amarillo, Texas
KFPW-FM - Barling, Arkansas
WUSH - Poquoson, Virginia
WMVN - East St. Louis, Illinois
WRQQ - Hammond, Louisiana
WTKN - Murrells Inlet, South Carolina ("Rhythmic AC", but leaned "Rhythmic Oldies")
KWNZ - Lovelock, Nevada
KHLR - Benton, Arkansas (More of a "Rhythmic Oldies", but leaned "Rhythmic AC")
KKBA - Kingsville, Texas
WLYB - Livingston, Alabama (Technically "adult hits", but leans Rhythmic AC)
WSNP - South Bristol, New York
K283CD - Bellmead, Texas
CFXJ-FM - Toronto
KQFX - Borger, Texas ("Rhythmic Hot AC")
WZWK-LP - Greenville, South Carolina ("Rhythmic Hot AC")
WISX - Philadelphia (leans towards classic hip hop/R&B, previously aired the format from 2006-2010)
PWL Radio — London, United Kingdom (online only, 2004-2006)

See also - related formats 
Classic hip hop
Rhythmic oldies
Urban adult contemporary
Adult contemporary
Rhythmic contemporary
Dance/Mix Show Airplay (Dance contemporary)

References

External links
 An Early Peek at Rhythmic AC (October 2006) from Coleman Insights

Radio formats